Philip Siu Lun Lee  (born May 5, 1944; Chinese: 李紹麟) was the 24th lieutenant governor of Manitoba. He was made a Member of the Order of Canada in 1999 and received the Queen’s Golden Jubilee Medal in 2002.

Born and raised in Hong Kong, Lee migrated to Canada in 1962 to study at the University of Manitoba. He graduated with a bachelor of science degree in 1966, and a public administration diploma in 1977. In 1967 he was hired by the City of Winnipeg as a research chemist. He helped organize the Chinese pavilion in the first Folklorama in 1970 and later became Vice President of the Folk Arts Council of Winnipeg. In the 1977 Manitoba general election, Lee ran as a Progressive Conservative candidate in Winnipeg Centre where he lost to Bud Boyce of the Manitoba New Democratic Party.  Lee was on Winnipeg's Refugee Assistance Committee from 1979 to 1986. He also advocated for the construction of the Winnipeg Chinese Cultural and Community Centre in the Dynasty Building, the Chinese Gate and Garden, and the Mandarin Building in Winnipeg.

His appointment as Lieutenant Governor was made by Governor General of Canada Michaëlle Jean, on the Constitutional advice of Prime Minister of Canada Stephen Harper, on June 19, 2009. Upon assuming the office on August 4, 2009, Lee became the 24th lieutenant governor of the province. Lee left office on June 19, 2015, after a six-year term.

Lee was the third Chinese Canadian to be a provincial vice-regal, after David Lam of British Columbia and Norman Kwong of Alberta.

Arms

References

External links
Official website of the Lieutenant-Governor of Manitoba

1944 births
Living people
Canadian chemists
Hong Kong emigrants to Canada
Lieutenant Governors of Manitoba
Members of the Order of Canada
Members of the Order of Manitoba
Naturalized citizens of Canada
Politicians from Winnipeg
21st-century Canadian politicians